Irasburg is the primary village and a census-designated place (CDP) in the town of Irasburg, Orleans County, Vermont, United States. As of the 2020 census, it had a population of 159, out of 1,233 in the entire town of Irasburg.

The CDP is in central Orleans County, south of the geographic center of the town. The Black River, a tributary of Lake Memphremagog, flows through the community, passing north of the village center which is sited on a hilltop.

Vermont Route 14 passes through the village, leading north  to Coventry and southwest  to Albany. Vermont Route 58 joins Route 14 in the village center but leads east  to Orleans and west  to Lowell.

References 

Populated places in Orleans County, Vermont
Census-designated places in Orleans County, Vermont
Census-designated places in Vermont